The  or in official usage the "Hokkaidō electoral district" (北海道選挙区, Hokkaidō senkyo-ku) is one of eleven proportional representation (PR) blocks for the House of Representatives in the Diet of Japan. It consists of Hokkaidō and is one of two PR blocks that covers only one prefecture, the other being Tokyo. Following the introduction of proportional voting, it elected nine representatives in the election of 1996. Since 2000, the Hokkaidō PR block has been represented by eight representatives.

Summary of results 
With eight seats, Hokkaidō is the second-smallest PR block (Shikoku has only six seats), and the vote share needed to gain a seat is usually above ten percent. In 2000, when the combined vote of the two major parties reached a low of 56.8%, the Social Democratic Party managed to obtain a seat with only 8.9% of the vote (for a detailed explanation, see D'Hondt method).

In addition to the five national parties that emerged from the party realignments of the 1990s, the regionalist one-man party New Party Daichi has become a contender for PR seats in Hokkaidō. In the first three elections in which it fielded candidates, it managed to obtain the third-largest vote share and one seat. In 2012, the Liberal Democratic Party became first party in the Hokkaidō proportional election for the first time, and has narrowly held onto that position in 2014 and 2017.

Party names are abbreviated as follows (format: abbreviation, translated name, Japanese name, Engrish name):
 DPJ "Democratic Party", Minshutō, Democratic Party
 LDP Liberal Democratic Party, Jiyūminshutō
 Kōmeitō "Justice Party", Kōmeitō, New Justice Party Party
 JCP Japanese Communist Party, Nihon Kyōsantō
 SDP Social Democratic Party, Shakaiminshutō
 NFP New Frontier Party, Shinshintō
 LP Liberal Party, Jiyūtō
 HRP Happiness Realization Party, Kōfuku-jitsugen-tō
 Honshitsu "New Party 'The Essential'", Shintō Honshitsu

List of representatives

Recent results

2017 
 #: List rank assigned by the party
 District column: For double candidates who concurrently ran in a single-member electoral district, the district column contains the electoral district where they stood and the sekihairitsu (lit. "narrow defeat ratio"), the ratio of margin of defeat. It determines the ranking of candidates who are put on the same list rank by their party.
 (in parentheses): Double candidates who are not eligible for election in the proportional block either because they won their district races or were disqualified for having received less than 10% of the vote in the district race (the same threshold as for losing the deposit in the single-member district election)

2014 
 #: List rank assigned by the party
 District column: For double candidates who concurrently ran in a single-member electoral district, the district column contains the electoral district where they stood and the sekihairitsu (lit. "narrow defeat ratio"), the ratio of margin of defeat. It determines the ranking of candidates who are put on the same list rank by their party.
 (in parentheses): Double candidates who are not eligible for election in the proportional block either because they won their district races or were disqualified for having received less than 10% of the vote in the district race (the same threshold as for losing the deposit in the single-member district election)

2012 
 #: List rank assigned by the party
 District column: For double candidates who concurrently ran in a single-member electoral district, the district column contains the electoral district where they stood and the sekihairitsu (lit. "narrow defeat ratio"), the ratio of margin of defeat. It determines the ranking of candidates who are put on the same list rank by their party.
 (in parentheses): Double candidates who are not eligible for election in the proportional block either because they won their district races or were disqualified (for having received less than 10% of the vote in the district race)

2009

References 

 Heartbeats Corp., The Senkyo: Results of general and by-elections for the House of Representatives since 1890

Politics of Hokkaido
PR Hokkaido